Vysoke is a village in Beryslav Raion, within Kherson Oblast, Ukraine. It was founded in 1928 as Neufeld and renamed Vysoke in 1946.  Vysoke belongs to Tiahynka rural hromada, one of the hromadas of Ukraine. Its population was 1,030.

References 

Villages in Beryslav Raion